Goldie and Wendy are fictional identical twins in the graphic novel series Sin City, created by Frank Miller. In the 2005 film adaptation, they are played by Jaime King. They are blond, dark-eyed femmes fatale.

They first appeared in The Hard Goodbye, followed by appearances in A Dame to Kill For and And Behind Door Number Three?.

The Hard Goodbye

One night, Goldie offers sexual services to Marv, and he immediately falls in love with her. They spend the night together, but in the morning Marv wakes up to find Goldie lying in bed next to him, murdered. He hears the sound of the police outside the building, coming for him. He escapes, killing many of the police as he does.

Wendy and Gail capture Marv, believing that he killed Goldie. They tie Marv in a chair and try to torture a confession out of him, but he unties himself and Wendy realizes that he is not her sister's murderer. Later they discover that Cardinal Roark used Kevin, a cannibalistic serial killer, to murder Goldie and frame Marv. Wendy and Marv go to the Roark farm, and while Wendy waits in the car, Marv tortures and kills Kevin. Marv finds and kills Cardinal Roark, but is seen doing it by the police. He is sentenced to the electric chair. When Wendy comes to visit him in prison, Marv mistakenly calls her Goldie and apologizes. She answers "Call me Goldie" and they kiss madly. Later, after several failed attempts, the authorities manage to electrocute Marv.

A Dame to Kill For

Marv and Dwight McCarthy go to Old Town, place where the twin sisters work. Goldie offers sexual services to Marv and he accepts, and that makes the beginning of "The Hard Goodbye" storyline.

And Behind Door Number Three?

This is a short story about Gail and Wendy (who's now wearing Marv's necklace) setting a trap for a man they suspect is 'carving up' girls in Old Town. After Wendy lures him in doors, Gail shoots him in the knee and ties him up. The story ends with Miho coming in to torture him.

Film appearance
They are portrayed by Jaime King in the 2005 film adaptation as the two twins in the second story in the film The Hard Goodbye. She reprises her role in the 2014 sequel based on A Dame to Kill For. In the former film, they are both blondes and look identical. In the latter film Goldie is shown in full color as a blonde who wears a white dress; Wendy is shown in black-and-white as a blonde who wears a black dress and carries a pistol in an Old West gunbelt (as her role as an Old Town enforcer).

References

Comics characters introduced in 1991
Dark Horse Comics film characters
Sin City characters
Female characters in comics
Fictional characters from Washington (state)
Fictional prostitutes
Fictional identical twins
Comic strip duos
Characters created by Frank Miller (comics)
Crime film characters